Richard Gorman  (December 20, 1935 – August 6, 2010) was a Canadian painter and printmaker. He was known for his magnetic prints which he created using ink covered ball-bearings manipulated with a magnet held behind the drawing board and for his large paintings in which he broadly handled paint.

Biography
Gorman grew up in Ottawa, a city where the National Gallery of Canada with its offering of Canadian art, particularly Tom Thomson, is an inescapable presence. Gorman's first art classes were at the gallery.

Gorman was recognized early as a painter of promise. Having moved to Toronto to attend the Ontario College of Art and Design, Gorman was written about by Jock Macdonald, his teacher, that he had the greatest promise among all the young artists he knew. As a member of the Isaacs Group of artists from 1959 on, composed of artists who showed their work at the Isaacs Gallery, he was a maverick whose main interest seems to have been a search for spiritual meaning. Although achieving major success as a painter, he became an early Isaacs drop-out. In 1964, he travelled to Ibiza, an island which is part of the Balearic group in Spain. In 1966, he left for London, England, only returning to Toronto in 1971.

At first, his abstraction only evoked landscape references, then he turned to painting nature full scale, especially the foliage and sky around Limerick Lake area near Bancroft, where his brother John had a cabin. He said that for him, the best thing about the city was the ruggedness of the nearby landscape.

A retrospective exhibition of Jock Macdonald in 1981 sent him again to study nature. In 1983, his memories of the work of Tom Thomson came together in a three-part Homage to Tom Thomson. He invented an alter-ego for himself: a painter named Jack Pine, who used to travel the northern rivers in a canoe painted all over in a yellow-and-black checkerboard pattern modeled on Canadian road sign painting. From 1984 to 1985 he created a 30-foot mural for Ottawa's Provincial Court House, titled Before the Law. Gorman said it was an image of nature near Ottawa before the explorers came. In 1986, a second 30-foot mural was commissioned for the Department of External Affairs at the Canadian embassy in Bridgetown, Barbados.

Gorman painted in watercolour as well as oil during these years, as well as making several thousand drawings of the figure. In 1889, he returned to Toronto, opened a studio, and returned, mostly, to abstraction. In 1990, the Lake Galleries in Toronto in combination with the Robert McLaughlin Gallery in Oshawa held a retrospective of 30 years of his work.

Public Collections
Agnes Etherington Art Centre, Kingston
Art Gallery of Ontario, Toronto
National Gallery of Canada, Ottawa
The Robert McLaughlin Gallery, Oshawa
Victoria and Albert Museum, London, England
Shanghai Art Museum, China

Gorman was elected a member of the Royal Canadian Academy in 1976.

References

Bibliography

Nasgaard, Roald. Abstract Painting in Canada. Vancouver: Douglas & McIntyre, 2008. 

1935 births
2010 deaths
Artists from Ottawa
Canadian male painters
20th-century Canadian printmakers
20th-century Canadian painters
Abstract painters
Canadian abstract artists
20th-century Canadian male artists
Canadian muralists
Members of the Royal Canadian Academy of Arts
Canadian collage artists